Criminals Within (also issued as Army Mystery) is a 1941 American drama film directed by Joseph H. Lewis and starring Eric Linden, Ben Alexander and Donald Curtis. It was released on June 27, 1941.

Cast list
 Eric Linden as Corporal Greg Carroll
 Ben Alexander as Sergeant Paul
 Donald Curtis as Lieutenant Harmon
 Ann Doran as Linda
 Constance Worth as Alma Barton
 Weldon Heyburn as Sergeant Blake
 Dudley Dickerson as Sam Dillingham
 Bernice Pilot as Mamie
 Ray Erlenborn as Private Norton
 I. Stanford Jolley as Carl Flegler

References

External links
 
 

American drama films
1941 drama films
1941 films
American black-and-white films
1940s English-language films
1940s American films